Quiet Wedding is a 1941 British romantic comedy film directed by Anthony Asquith and starring Margaret Lockwood, Derek Farr and Marjorie Fielding. The screenplay was written by Terence Rattigan and Anatole de Grunwald based on the play Quiet Wedding by Esther McCracken. The film was remade in 1958 as Happy Is the Bride.

Premise
A young couple become engaged, but undergo a number of misadventures before their wedding ceremony.

Cast

Production
It was Lockwood's first film following a series of films with Carol Reed.

Critical reception
The New York Times wrote, "a foreword to the film states that its production was interrupted five times when Nazi bombs exploded on the studio, but all their destructive fury has left no visible mark on the quiet humor and the atmosphere of hearthside warmth that permeate this wisp of a tale about a young couple on the eve of their marriage...Anthony Asquith has directed with tender appreciation of his material this completely unpretentious and charming film, the component parts of which are as delicately balanced as the mechanism of a watch."

References

External links 
 
 
Quiet Wedding at Britmovie

1941 films
1941 romantic comedy films
1940s English-language films
Films directed by Anthony Asquith
British romantic comedy films
Films with screenplays by Terence Rattigan
Films with screenplays by Anatole de Grunwald
British black-and-white films
Films produced by Paul Soskin
British films based on plays
Films about weddings
1940s British films